Ficus ingens, the red-leaved fig, is a fig species with an extensive range in the subtropical to dry tropical regions of Africa and southern Arabia. Despite its specific name, which means "huge", or "vast", it is usually a shrub or tree of modest proportions. It is a fig of variable habit depending on the local climate and substrate, typically a stunted subshrub on elevated rocky ridges, or potentially a large tree on warmer plains and lowlands. In 1829 the missionary Robert Moffat found a rare giant specimen, into which seventeen thatch huts of a native tribe were placed, so as to be out of reach of lions.

Distribution and habitat
It is widespread in northern and eastern sub-Saharan Africa, with a more or less contiguous range from Senegal in the west, eastwards to Eritrea, and southwards to the Eastern Cape, South Africa. It is extant in the Saharo-montane woodlands of the Tassili n'Ajjer, the Hoggar, Aïr and Tibesti mountains, and the Kerkour Nourene massif. It is also found in southernmost Oman, mainly in the region south of Dhofar, called Salalah. It is found on rock faces and outcrops, rocky slopes, riparian and wadi fringes, and in dense woodlands. Substrates include lava flows, coral and limestone in drier, exposed areas, and sandstone or dolomite in bushveld.

Description

The smooth and leathery, dull-green leaves are narrowly ovate oblong, bright red brown when young, with conspicuous yellow veins that are prominent beneath and loop along the leaf margin. A leaf measures some 16.5 by 8.5 cm, with the base mostly square or cordate, sometimes broadly rounded, and the apex tapering to a blunt point. Old leaves turn to a reddish-copper colour in autumn.

The almost spherical figs are produced year-round but mainly in summer. They are 0.9 to 1.2 cm in diameter and carried on very short stalks, just below or among the terminal cluster of leaves. They ripen first to a white and eventually a purple or yellowish-brown colour.

The smooth bark is pale grey, while younger branches have a yellow tinge. Bruised or cut stems and leaves exude a non-toxic, milky latex.

Habit and variation
It is deciduous or semi-deciduous and may form a subshrub or shrub, or may form a rounded crown, upwards of 5 meters tall, in sheltered conditions. In the warm lowveld they may form a spreading canopy up to 15 meters tall, with a bole 2 meters in diameter. In the Magaliesberg and Witwatersrand bankenveld they typically straddle boulders or are closely pressed to sunny, north to west-facing (in southern hemisphere) rock faces. Plants of the Eastern Cape are more tomentose.

Uses and species interactions
In northern Nigeria the figs, and in Kenya the leaves and figs, have been recorded as famine food. In South Africa a decoction of the bark mixed with cow feed is said to increase the flow of milk, though the leaves have been shown to be toxic to cattle, and sometimes to sheep. When ripe, the figs are readily eaten by several species of bird. The pollinator wasp is Platyscapa soraria Wiebes., while Otitesella longicauda and O. rotunda are non-pollinators.

Similar species
It is similar to the Wonderboom fig, which has a broadly overlapping range and occurs in comparable habitat. They differ with respect to leaf shape, venation and colour, besides the size and colour of the figs. The Wonderboom is always a tree, and has elliptic-oblong leaves with a rounded bases, that are never bright red-brown. Its figs are much smaller and mature to yellow-red. The Natal fig has the base of the leaf narrowly tapered.

Gallery

Notes

References

External links
 

ingens
Trees of Africa
Afrotropical realm flora
Taxa named by Friedrich Anton Wilhelm Miquel